Dimitar Andonovski (born September 6, 1985 in Bitola, SR Macedonia, SFR Yugoslavia) is a Macedonian singer.

Dimitar Andonovski was a student at the Center for Music Education in his native home town of Bitola, Republic of Macedonia. He is not known only for being such a good singer, but he is also a good violinist. His first singing experience was in 1994 when he participated on children festival Si-Do in Bitola, and immediately after that, he appeared on Macedonian Television.

He rose to fame in 2003 when he was one of the candidates on M2 Play Search, organised in December 2003. He was not in the top four, so did not take part in the new group '4play'. He was one of the three backing vocalists of Tijana Dapčević in the Eurovision Song Contest 2014.

Discography

Albums
 Potraga Po Sozvezdie (2003)

Singles
 1994: "Koga Ema Bi Znaela"
 2003: "Ne Sakav Da Te Zasakam"
 2006: "Seušte Me Sonuvas"
 2006: "Isti Zborovi"
 2008: "Mi zede se"
 2009: "Zarobeni vo son"
 2009: "Ova nebo znae se"
 2010: "Kameno srce"
 2010: "Gledaj me vo oci"
 2011: "Svoj na Svoeto"
 2012: "Dobro Me Poznavas"
 2013: "Mesecina"
 2013: "Ako Me Boli"
 2013:, Vo mene Ljubovta umira, 
 2013:, Razbudime na polnok, 
 2014: "Se što ti vetiv"
 2015:  "Zal mi e"

References

External links
 
 

1985 births
Living people
21st-century Macedonian male singers
Macedonian pop singers
People from Bitola